The 2021–22 season was Željezničar's 101st in existence and their 22nd season in the Premier League BH. Besides competing in the domestic league, the team also competed in the National Cup.

Season review

June
On 4 June, Željezničar and Result Sports signed a partnership agreement. Željezničar and Samir Bekrić negotiated a one-year contract extension lasting until June 2022. 

On 12 June, Nazif Hasanbegović was announced as the new Chairman of the club, replacing Samir Cerić.

On 18 June, Tomislav Ivković was appointed as the new manager, replacing Blaž Slišković. His assistant manager was announced to be Armando Marenzi.

On 19 June, Željezničar extended their sponsorship agreement with Transportbeton Strohmaier.

On 21 June, Željezničar officially began the pre-season for the upcoming 2021–22 season.

On 23 June, Željezničar extended their sponsorship agreement with General Logistic.

July
On 9 July, Željezničar announced the signing of 26-year-old former youth team–player Nedim Mekić as a free agent. Željezničar and Vedad Muftić negotiated a one-year contract extension lasting until June 2022, while youth players Nikola Milićević, Omar Beća and Amar Drina signed their first professional contract. The club also announced Kenan Hasagić as the new goalkeeping coach.

On 13 July, Željezničar and Igman Konjic signed a memorandum of cooperation and partnership in the field of sports, becoming official club partners.

On 16 July, youth player Faruk Duraković signed a one-year contract with the club. Željezničar extended their sponsorship agreement with Garden City Konjic, and signed a new sponsorship agreement with Igman.

On 26 July, Željezničar announced the signing of 22-year-old Ognjen Stjepanović and 19–year–old Hasan Jahić as free agents. They last played for Zvijezda 09 and Mladost Doboj Kakanj respectively.

On 27 July, Željezničar and Mozzart signed a long term sponsorship agreement lasting until 2024, becoming the club's new gold sponsor.

On 28 July, Željezničar extended their sponsorship agreement with Sarajevo osiguranje.

August
On 6 August, Željezničar signed a new sponsorship agreement with Top Color.

On 9 August, Željezničar extended their sponsorship agreement with Nova Vita.

On 10 August, Željezničar extended their sponsorship agreement with Farmavita.

On 18 August, Željezničar signed a new partnership agreement with SoftCon Agency.

On 19 August, Željezničar extended their sponsorship agreement with Adriatic osiguranje.

On 25 August, Željezničar announced the signing of 22-year-old Haris Hajdarević.

September
On 8 September, Željezničar announced the signing of 18-year-old Denis Kovačević.

On 16 September, Željezničar and Aleksandar Kosorić negotiated a two-year contract extension lasting until June 2023.

November
On 17 November, youth player Neriman Kočević signed a one-year contract with the club.

December
On 1 December, Željezničar announced Caizcoin as the club's new general sponsor.

On 23 December, Željezničar announced the departure of Chairman of the club Nazif Hasanbegović.

On 24 December, Željezničar announced the departure of manager Tomislav Ivković.

January
On 7 January, Željezničar announced Edis Mulalić as the club's new manager.

On 19 January, Željezničar announced the signing of 23-year-old Benjamin Šehić.

On 24 January, Željezničar announced the signing of 34-year-old Edin Cocalić.

On 25 January, Željezničar announced the signing of 26-year-old Marin Galić.

On 31 January, Željezničar announced the signing of 24-year-old Aleksandar Vucenovic.

February
On 15 February, Željezničar announced the signing of 28-year-old Armin Ćerimagić.

On 21 February, Željezničar extended their sponsorship agreement with Sarajevski kiseljak, ELPI Comerc and HOŠE Komerc. The club also announced the signing of 22-year-old Ševkija Resić.

On 28 February, Željezničar announced the signing of 21-year-old Armin Hodžić.

March
On 7 March, Željezničar extended their sponsorship agreement with Deny-Prom and Amko komerc.

On 23 March, Željezničar announced the signing of 22-year-old Adeshina Fatai.

April
On 21 April, Željezničar extended their sponsorship agreement with NLB Banka.

Squad information

Players

Disciplinary record
Includes all competitive matches and only players that got booked throughout the season. The list is sorted by shirt number, and then position.

Squad statistics

Goalscorers

Assists

Clean sheets

Transfers

Players in 

Total expenditure:  €0

Players out 

Total income:  €
Net:  €

Club

Coaching staff
{|
|valign="top"|

Other information

Sponsorship

|-

Competitions

Pre-season

Mid-season

Overall

Premijer Liga BiH

League table

Results summary

Results by round

Matches

Kup BiH

Round of 32

Round of 16

Notes

References

External links

FK Željezničar Sarajevo seasons
Zeljeznicar